Miles Tobey Granger (August 12, 1817, New Marlboro, Massachusetts – October 21, 1895) was a judge of the Supreme Court of Errors (now called the Connecticut Supreme Court) in 1876 and served until March 1, 1887, when he resigned. He was a Democratic member of the United States House of Representatives from Connecticut's 4th congressional district from 1887 to 1889. He served as member of the Connecticut House of Representatives in 1857, and in the Connecticut Senate in 1866 and 1867.

Early life 
Granger was born in New Marlboro, Massachusetts, Granger moved with his parents to Canaan, Connecticut, in 1819. He pursued common-school and academic studies, and graduated from Wesleyan University, Middletown, Connecticut, in 1842, and there became a member of the Mystical Seven.

He moved to Louisiana in 1843 where he taught for a private family in West Feliciana Parish, and he was admitted to the bar of Wilkinson County, Mississippi, in April 1845.

He returned to Canaan, Connecticut, and was admitted to the bar in Litchfield County in October 1845 and practiced law in Canaan 1847-1867. After 1849, he was a Probate Judge, District of Canaan for fifteen of eighteen years.

On October 21, 1846, he married Miss Sarah C. Ferguson of Sheffield, Massachusetts. They had six children, Bertha I., Samuel F., Mary F., Josie, Kittie M., Carrie Tobey.

Granger served as member of the Connecticut House of Representatives in 1857, and in the Connecticut Senate in 1866 and 1867.

From 1867 to 1876, he was a judge of the Superior Court of Connecticut, and Granger was elected judge of the Supreme Court of Errors (now the Supreme Court of Connecticut) in 1876 and served until March 1, 1887, when he resigned.

Granger was elected to the Fiftieth Congress (March 4, 1887 – March 3, 1889). He was not a candidate for renomination in 1888.

Granger was elected State referee in 1893 and served until his death in North Canaan, Connecticut, October 21, 1895, where he was interred in the Lower Cemetery.

References

1817 births
1895 deaths
Democratic Party Connecticut state senators
Justices of the Connecticut Supreme Court
Democratic Party members of the Connecticut House of Representatives
People from Canaan, Connecticut
People from Berkshire County, Massachusetts
Wesleyan University alumni
Democratic Party members of the United States House of Representatives from Connecticut
19th-century American politicians
19th-century American judges